Fucking A may refer to:
 Fucking A, a play written by American playwright Suzan-Lori Parks.
 Fuckin A, an album by The Thermals
 Fuckin' A, an album by Anal Cunt